The Pegas Certus is a Czech single-place paraglider that was designed and produced by Pegas 2000 of Prague. It is now out of production.

Design and development
The aircraft was designed as a competition glider. The models are each named for their approximate wing area in square metres.

The design has progressed through several generations of models, each improving on the last.

Variants
Certus 2 26
Mid-sized model for medium-weight pilots.
Certus 2 28
Large-sized model for heavier pilots.

Specifications (Certus 26)

References

Certus
Paragliders